Sanctuary is an album supporting charity which was recorded in July 2007 at Glenstal Abbey, Co. Limerick, Ireland. The album features artists Moya Brennan, Mary Coughlan, Nóirín Ní Riain, Cara O'Sullivan, Jimmy O'Brien-Moran, the Monks of Glenstal and many others. The genres of music include Traditional Irish, folk, Gregorian chant, contemporary popular and classical.

All profits from the album will go to charities supporting victims of domestic violence in Ireland. The artists have all given of their work and time at no cost and have raised the money to pay for the production of this album so that the charities will benefit from the sale of the very first CD. Three charities will benefit: Adapt House, AMEN and the ISPCC.

Release
Sanctuary was released at a launch concert at Glenstal Abbey on 1 June 2008. It is available in CD form and as a download from the iTunes Store.

Single

The first single to be released from the album is "Stars Are Made for the Sky", by Nassau Royal, featuring Moya Brennan on backing vocals. This is a download only release and is available from the iTunes Store.

Charities
The proceeds from Sanctuary go the Irish charities that support men, women, children and families affected by domestic violence in Ireland.

Irish Society for the Prevention of Cruelty to Children (ISPCC)
Childline (Ireland)
4me Mentoring
Childfocus
Leanbh
Adapt House
AMEN
Foyle Women's Aid
Children's Unit

Performances
Sanctuary was launched in Glenstal Abbey on 1 June 2008. The launch consisted of a concert featuring most of the artists and production team involved on the album as well as special guests including Alyth. A second concert took place in Derry's Millennium Forum on 10 November 2008.

Track listing
"Himo Hokio" (Nóirín Ní Riain, Moya Brennan & size2shoes) – 2:05
"Where'er You Walk" (Cara O'Sullivan) – 3:53
"Planxty Glenstal" (Tonnta) – 3:47
"Still in Love" (Mary Coughlan) – 4:32
"Stars Are Made from the Sky" (Nassau Royal featuring Moya Brennan) – 3:45
"Angels Guard Thee" (Cara O'Sullivan) – 4:39
"Laetatus Sum" (Br. Cuthbert Brennan OSB) – 2:43
"An Sgeilpín Droighneach" (Jimmy O'Brien Moran) – 1:56
"Hallelujah" (Mary Coughlan) – 5:03
"Take Me Now" (James O'Brien Moran) – 2:42
"Gaoth Barra" (Moya Brennan) – 2:08
"Lady Dillon" (Tonnta) – 4:07
"The Song of Wandering Aengus" (Nóirín Ní Riain) – 3:10
"Stand Beside Me" (Moya Brennan) – 4:01
"Sanctuary" (Various artists) – 5:36
"How Can I Keep from Singing" (All Artists above) – 3:36

Personnel
Moya Brennan
Nóirín Ní Riain
Mary Coughlan
Cara O'Sullivan
Jimmy O'Brien-Moran
Nassau Royal
Holly Geraghty
James O'Brien-Moran
Eoin Ó Súilleabháin (size2shoes)
Mícheál P. Ó Súilleabháin (size2shoes)
Una Whyte
Meabh de Buitléir
Kate McKenna
Tricia Lyons
Grit Glass
Fidelma Hanrahan
Aisling Fitzpatrick
Robbie Perry
John O Connel
Howard Kitchen
Cuthbert Brennan OSB
Andrew Cyprian Love OSB
John Columba McCann OSB

Production
Fr. Joseph Mc Gilloway OSB – Producer & Project director
Simon O'Reilly Website – Additional recording
Simon O'Reilly – Mixing
Aidan Foley, Master Labs – Mastering
Mella Travers  - Photography Website, Mella Travers & Tim Jarvis – Layout design

References

External links 
 Sanctuary on MySpace – Official Website
 Nóirín Ní Riain

2008 albums
Charity albums